The Oklahoma City Ford Motor Company Assembly Plant is a four-story brick structure in downtown Oklahoma City, Oklahoma. Opened in 1916 by the Ford Motor Company as a Model T manufacturing facility, it was one of 24 such plants built by Ford between 1910 and 1915. More recently in 2018, the facility debuted as a boutique hotel known as the 21c Museum Hotel Oklahoma City. It was inducted into Historic Hotels of America, the official program of the National Trust for Historic Preservation, not long thereafter in 2019.

References

Buildings and structures in Oklahoma City
Ford factories
Motor vehicle assembly plants in Oklahoma
Industrial buildings and structures on the National Register of Historic Places in Oklahoma
Economy of Oklahoma City
Motor vehicle manufacturing plants on the National Register of Historic Places
Transportation buildings and structures on the National Register of Historic Places in Oklahoma
Defunct manufacturing companies based in Oklahoma